Dragon Lord is the name of several unrelated fictional characters appearing in American comic books published by Marvel Comics.

Publication history
The first Dragon Lord appeared in Sub-Mariner #52-54 (August–October 1972), and was created by Bill Everett (artist)Mike Friedrich (writer).

The Dragon Lord Yu-Ti first appeared in Marvel Premiere #15 (May 1974), and was created by Roy Thomas and Gil Kane. The character subsequently appears in Deadly Hands of Kung Fu #10 (March 1975), Marvel Premiere #22 (June 1975), Master of Kung Fu Annual #1 (1976), Deadly Hands of Kung Fu #21 (February 1976), Iron Fist #6-7 (August–September 1976), Marvel Team-Up #64 (December 1977), Power Man and Iron Fist #74-75 (October–November 1981), and Immortal Iron Fist #4-8 (May–October 2007), and #10-14 (December 2007-June 2008).

Tako Shamara first appeared in Marvel Spotlight (vol. 2) #5 (March, 1980), and was created by Marv Wolfman and Steve Ditko. In his first appearance the character battled a huge dragon from the past called a Wani, a monster that destroyed his ancestors' villages in 1582. The creature that Tako battled was intended to be Godzilla but since Marvel no longer had the rights to the character (which had lapsed the previous year) the creature was modified to a dragon called The Wani.

Ral Dorn, the Dragon Lord, appeared in Fantastic Four Annual #16 (1981), and was created by Ed Hannigan and Steve Ditko.

History

Dragon Lord
 
The Dragon Lord was a fanatic bent on avenging Japan's defeat in World War II. Although blind, he appears to be able to "see" mentally. He used Sunfire as an ally, but Namor later convinced Sunfire of Dragon Lord's intentions to conquer the world for his own benefit.  The two heroes stopped Dragon Lord's plans and destroyed his base.

Nu-An

Nu-An is the Yu-Ti (a name given to the rulers of K'un-Lun) who also uses the alias of Dragon Lord as did his father Lord Tuan.

Tako Shamara

In his first appearance the character battled a huge dragon from the past called a Wani, a monster that destroyed his ancestors' villages in 1582.

Dragon Lord later appears in Camp Hammond as an official recruit for the Initiative, only to be killed when K.I.A. attacks the group of new trainees. The surviving trainees, along with Triathlon and the Taskmaster, present his ashes and a flag to Shamara's family at their Long Island home. Shamara's son states that he intends to honor his father by taking up his mantle.

Ral Dorn
 
Ral Dorn was a human of Earthly parentage who leads the Dragon Riders of the extradimensional world of Rammatpolen. The Dragon Riders use dragons as mounts in their journeys through time and space. Ral Dorn has used the Dragon Man as his own mount.

Powers and abilities
Nu-An has some degree of combat skills, but he shows minimal skills. Apparently, he is immune to aging due to him eating a fruit from the Tree of Immortality.

The Tako Shamara version of the Dragon Lord could summon dragons and control them through elixirs created in his cauldron. He was mocked by Taskmaster for this flaw, who felt that such an ability would not be useful in combat due to its time-consuming nature.

References

External links
 Dragon Lord (disambiguation) at Marvel.com
 Dragon Lord at the Marvel Database Project
 
 
 
 
 
 
 
 

Characters created by Bill Everett
Characters created by Marv Wolfman
Characters created by Mike Friedrich
Characters created by Steve Ditko
Comics characters introduced in 1972
Comics characters introduced in 1980
Comics characters introduced in 1981
Marvel Comics superheroes
Marvel Comics supervillains